Truscott may refer to:

Surnames

Arts
 Harold Truscott (1914–1992), English composer
 Mark Truscott (1970– ), poet

Bridge
 Alan Truscott (1925–2005), bridge writer and player
 Dorothy Hayden Truscott (1925–2006), bridge player and writer

Politics and diplomacy
 Francis Wyatt Truscott (1824–1895), Lord Mayor of London 
 Frank Truscott (1894–1969), Pennsylvania politician 
 George Wyatt Truscott (1857–1941), Lord Mayor of London 
 Neil Truscott (1923–2011), Australian diplomat
 Peter Truscott, Baron Truscott (born 1959), British Labour politician

Sport
 Keith Truscott DFC & Bar (1916–1943), Royal Australian Air Force fighter ace and Australian rules footballer 
 Paul Truscott (born 1986), English boxer
 Peter Truscott (born 1941), New Zealand cricketer
 William "Nipper" Truscott (1886–1966), Australian rules footballer

Other
 Carl Truscott (1957– ), former law enforcement officer and Bureau of Alcohol, Tobacco, Firearms and Explosives (ATF) Director 
 Lucian Truscott (1895–1965), US Army General
 Lucian Truscott IV (1947– ), novelist, journalist (grandson of Gen. Lucian Truscott)
 Meta Truscott (1917–2014), Australian diarist and Ashgrove historian
 Steven Truscott (1945– ), Canadian, originally convicted for murder, but acquitted 48 years later
 Tom Truscott, computer scientist who created Usenet

Fictional characters 
 Inspector Truscott in the Joe Orton play Loot
 Lilly Truscott in the TV series Hannah Montana
 Major Harry Kitchener Wellington Truscott in the TV series Fairly Secret Army

Places 
 Truscott, Texas
 Mungalalu Truscott Airbase
 Truscott, Cornwall